Tiree Music Festival is a Scottish folk music festival held annually on the Island of Tiree in the Inner Hebrides. The festival was founded in 2010 by resident Stewart MacLennan and local musician Daniel Gillespie of the band Skerryvore. It has received several awards from the Scottish tourism industry: Best Small Festival by Scottish Events Awards in 2012 and 2013; and 2013 Best Cultural Event by Highland and Island Tourism and Scottish Thistle Awards.

In August 2013, the weekend festival was attended by more than 1500 people. It incorporates three stages: an open air main stage, a marquee-housed community village stage and an indoor ceilidh stage.

References

External links
Videos & Review at Folk Radio UK

Music festivals in Scotland
Tiree
Culture in Argyll and Bute
Tourist attractions in Argyll and Bute